is a Japanese football player. He plays for Takasago Mineiro FC.

Playing career
Hino was born in Suita on July 29, 1982. He joined J1 League club Gamba Osaka from youth team in 2001. He could not play at all in the match behind Ryota Tsuzuki and Naoki Matsuyo until 2003. He debuted in 2004 Emperor's Cup and played several matches in 2005. Gamba also won the champions in 2005 J1 League. However he could not play many matches because Gamba also gained new goalkeeper Yosuke Fujigaya in 2005. In October 2006, he moved to Regional Leagues club FC Gifu. Gifu was promoted to Japan Football League from 2007. In 2007, he became a regular goalkeeper and played all 34 matches. Gifu also won the 3rd place and was promoted to J2 League from 2008. Although he played as regular goalkeeper, Gifu finished at the 13th place of 15 clubs in 2008 season. In 2009, he moved to J2 club Tokushima Vortis. Although he could not play at all in the match behind Hideaki Ueno in 2009 season, he played 15 matches in 2010 season. In 2011, he moved to Regional Leagues club Nara Club. He played as regular goalkeeper in 2 seasons until 2012. In 2013, he moved to Regional Leagues club Banditonce Kakogawa. He played as regular goalkeeper in 3 seasons until 2015. In 2016, he moved to Regional Leagues club Takasago Mineiro FC.

Club statistics

References

External links

1982 births
Living people
Association football people from Osaka Prefecture
Japanese footballers
J1 League players
J2 League players
Japan Football League players
Gamba Osaka players
FC Gifu players
Tokushima Vortis players
Nara Club players
Association football goalkeepers
People from Suita